Moria may refer to:

Arts and entertainment
 Moria (Middle-earth), fictional location in the works of J. R. R. Tolkien
 Moria: The Dwarven City, a 1984 fantasy role-playing game supplement
 Moria (1978 video game), a dungeon-crawler game
 Moria (1983 video game), a computer game inspired by The Lord of the Rings

People 
Blanche Moria (1859–1926), French sculptor, educator and feminist
Steve Moria (born 1961), British-Canadian ice hockey player
Moria Casán (born 1946), Argentine actress

Places
 Mória (Μόρια), a small town in the modern municipal unit of Mytilene, Lesbos, Greece
 Moria refugee camp near Mytilene, Lesbos
 Moria, Limpopo, South Africa
 Mōria, a holy place in Whirinaki, Northland, New Zealand

Other uses
 Moria (tree) (Μορια), a type of public olive tree in ancient Greece
 Moria (nymph) (Μορια "olive tree", a nymph named in Greek mythology
 Moria, a Byzantine term for the intervals of the 72 equal temperament music scale
 Moria (political party), in Israel
 Moria, the original description of Witzelsucht, a set of rare neurological symptoms
 Moria (genus), of the family Amnicolidae of freshwater snails

See also

 Moira (disambiguation)
 Morea (disambiguation)
 Moriah (disambiguation)
 Moriya (disambiguation)
 Morya (disambiguation)
 Noria (disambiguation)
Moriae Encomium, or In Praise of Folly, a 1509 essay